The Saenger Theatre is a historic theater in Pine Bluff, Arkansas.  Located at West Second 
Ave. and Pine St. on the southeast corner, it was added to the National Register of Historic Places in 1995. Built in 1924 to a design by Emile Weil, it is a Classical Revival brick building with an ornate interior that was last restyled in 1937.  It is one of only a handful of Saenger movie palaces that remain.

See also
 Saenger Theatre - a list of some that survive

References

Buildings and structures in Pine Bluff, Arkansas
Cinemas and movie theaters in Arkansas
Emile Weil buildings
Movie palaces
National Register of Historic Places in Pine Bluff, Arkansas
Saenger theatres
Theatres completed in 1924
Theatres on the National Register of Historic Places in Arkansas